The CMLL Día de Muertos (2020) (Spanish for "Day of the Dead") was a professional wrestling supercard event, scripted and produced by the Mexican lucha libre promotion Consejo Mundial de Lucha Libre (CMLL), held to celebrate the Mexican Day of the Dead celebration. The shows took place on October 30, 2020, in CMLL's main venue, Arena México, in Mexico City, Mexico. Traditionally several wrestlers will wear the traditional Día de Muertos face and body paint for the event. From around the mid-point of each show, the losing wrestlers will be dragged to El Inframundo ("The Underworld"; in actuality, a side entrance in the arena) by a group of wrestlers dressed up as minions of the ruler of the underworld. This will be the seventh year that CMLL celebrates the Día de Muertos in such a manner.

Sansón was meant to defend the Rey del Inframundo ("King of the Underworld") championship that he won at the 2017 Día de Muertos show and successfully defended on the 2018 and 2019 shows. However, he tested positive for COVID-19 and the championship was vacated. El Terrible defeated Euforia to win the vacant championship.

Production

Background
The October 31, 2014 Día de Muertos show was the first of Mexican professional wrestling promotion Consejo Mundial de Lucha Libre's Dia de los Muertos ("Day of the Dead") celebrations in 2014 and began a tradition of CMLL holding a major show to celebrate the Latin American holiday. As part of their Dia de los Muerte celebrations CMLL admitted all children in costumes for free for the show. CMLL held a second Dia de los Muerte celebration on Sunday November 2 as well. Both shows included the Edcanes, CMLL's ring girls and various wrestlers dressed up in traditional Día de Muertos garb. In 2014, CMLL also turned the basement of Arena México into a haunted house attraction before each show. CMLL has held one or more shows to celebrate the holiday annually since 2014, with 2020 marking the seventh year in a row.

Storylines
The 2020 Día de Muertos shows featured a number professional wrestling matches scripted by CMLL with some wrestlers involved in scripted feuds. Wrestlers portray either heels (referred to as rudos in Mexico, those that play the part of the "bad guys") or faces (técnicos in Mexico, the "good guy" characters) as they perform.

At the 2017 Día de Muertos show, Sansón outlasted El Cuatrero, Diamante Azul, Forastero, Hechicero, Místico, Soberano Jr. and Valiente in a torneo cibernetico elimination match to become the first ever Rey del Inframundo ("King of the Underworld"). While Sansón was given a championship belt to symbolize his victory it is not a championship, but a tournament trophy that is not defended outside of the annual tournament in the vein of CMLL's Leyenda de Plata or Leyenda de Azul tournaments. In 2018, Sansón successfully defended the Rey del Inframundo championship against Templario. In 2019, Sansón defended the Rey del Inframundo championship for a second time as he defeated Star Jr.

Matches

References

2020 in Mexico
2020 in professional wrestling
CMLL Día de Muertos
Events in Mexico City
October 2020 events in Mexico